Kurchatov may refer to one of the following.

Igor Kurchatov, the leader of the Soviet atomic bomb project
 Cities named after Igor Kurchatov
Kurchatov, Kazakhstan
Kurchatov, Russia
 Astronomical objects named after Igor Kurchatov
 Lunar crater Kurchatov (crater)
 Asteroid 2352 Kurchatov
 Scientific institutions named after Igor Kurchatov
Kurchatov Institute